Carlos Robles Rocha (born 15 May 1992) is a Colombian professional footballer who plays as a midfielder for Deportes Tolima.

Club career

Partizani Tirana
On 29 September 2015, Robles signed a one-year contract with Albanian side Partizani Tirana for an undisclosed side, taking the vacant number 11 for the 2015–16 season. Robles was an unused substitute in "Tirana derby" against Tirana, where Partizani won 1–0.

He made his debut in Albanian top flight on 17 October during the 1–2 away win against the newcomers of Bylis Ballsh. He came on the field in the 61st minute, replacing the Italian striker Emanuele Morini.

Robles was released by the club on 2 February 2016 after failing to make an impact there, playing only seven matches between league and cup.

International career

Robles has been a former youth member of Colombia national team, appearing eight time with Under-17 side in 2009. He played five matches in 2009 FIFA U-17 World Cup in an eventual semi-final exit against Switzerland U17.

Career statistics

Club

Honours

Club
Deportes Quindío

Categoría Primera B: Runner-up 2014

International
Colombia U17

FIFA U-17 World Cup: Fourth place 2009.

References

External links

1992 births
Living people
People from Valledupar
Colombian footballers
Association football midfielders
Deportes Quindío footballers
Once Caldas footballers
FK Partizani Tirana players
Categoría Primera A players
Categoría Primera B players
Kategoria Superiore players
Colombian expatriate footballers
Expatriate footballers in Albania
Colombian expatriate sportspeople in Albania